Trichocnaeia hilarula is a species of beetle in the family Cerambycidae, and the only species in the genus Trichocnaeia. It was described by Broun in 1880.

References

Desmiphorini
Beetles described in 1880
Monotypic beetle genera